Jack Ormandy (born 1912) was an English professional footballer who played as an outside left.

Career
Born in Liverpool, Ormandy played for Prescot Cables, Bradford City, Bury, Southend United, Oldham Athletic and Halifax Town. For Bradford City, he made 63 appearances in the Football League; he also made 3 FA Cup appearances.

For Bury, he made 87 appearances in the Football League; he also made 5 FA Cup appearances.

Sources

References

1912 births
Year of death missing
English footballers
Prescot Cables F.C. players
Bradford City A.F.C. players
Bury F.C. players
Southend United F.C. players
Oldham Athletic A.F.C. players
Halifax Town A.F.C. players
English Football League players
Association football outside forwards